Wesley Pruitt (born January 25, 1947) is an American politician, attorney, and social worker in the state of Washington. He served in the Washington House of Representatives from 1987 to 1995 as a Democrat. Pruitt was born in Springfield, Vermont and graduated in sociology at the University of Washington.

References

1947 births
Living people
Democratic Party members of the Washington House of Representatives